Cannabis in Martinique is illegal, but is illicitly produced and transported on the island. Some cannabis is grown locally on Martinique, but appears to be mostly for local consumption and has little impact on the larger drug market.

References

Further reading
Beck F., Legleye S., Merle S. Pierre-Louis K. (2003), Usage de produits psychoactifs entre 17et 19 ans a la Martinique: résultats de l'enquéte ESCAPAD 2002, OSM Flash No.32 8p

Martinique
Crime in Martinique
Politics of Martinique
Society of Martinique
Martinique
Martinique